Tourism in North Korea is tightly controlled by the North Korean government. All tourism is organized by one of several state-owned tourism bureaus, including Korea International Travel Company (KITC), Korean International Sports Travel Company (KISTC), Korean International Taekwondo Tourism Company (KITTC) and Korean International Youth Travel Company (KIYTC). The majority of tourists are Chinese nationals:
one 2019 estimate indicated that up to 120,000 Chinese tourists had visited North Korea in the previous year, compared to fewer than 5,000 from Western countries.

In response to the threats posed by the COVID-19 pandemic in North Korea, North Korea closed its borders to foreign tourists on 22 January 2020. As of 8 April 2021, tourism has not been allowed to resume and the economic losses are estimated to be at least $175 million.

Restrictions and warnings
Interactions between foreign tourists and local people have historically been tightly controlled. , foreigners can buy SIM cards at  Pyongyang airport, providing access to international calling.

The Swedish diplomatic mission to North Korea emphasises that contempt for the North Korean nation, its leaders and its symbols such as its national flag, portraits of their leaders, propaganda posters, etc. are regarded by North Korean authorities as very offensive. The tolerance level for disruptive behaviour is minimal and this can lead to long term imprisonment or hard labour.

On 1 February 2017, the United States released a travel warning to United States citizens, warning would-be visitors of previous encounters and dangers in North Korea.

Since 1 September 2017, the United States Department of State has prohibited the use of U.S. passports (except those with a special validation) for travel to North Korea, arguing that U.S. citizens have been subject to arrest and long detention for actions that would not otherwise be a cause for arrest in the United States or other countries. The U.S. Department of State also states that it has received reports of North Korean authorities detaining U.S. citizens without charges and not allowing them to depart the country. North Korea has detained U.S. citizens who were part of organized tours.

Guided tours
Guided tours for tourists are mandatory. , North Korea has been open to tourists during the winter. The Masikryong Ski Resort outside Wonsan City in Kangwon Province opened in early 2014. While tourists have historically been restricted to Pyongyang, some tours have recently been able to expand to other parts of the country such as Rajin (and the market there) and Chongjin.

Tourists can fly directly to Pyongyang from Beijing, Shenyang and Shanghai, with train services to Pyongyang from Beijing and Dandong also available.

Tourists from Western countries

For Westerners, there are a small number of private tour operators that help provide access to North Korea. These include Koryo Tours (known for its North Korean-related films such as Comrade Kim Goes Flying and strong history in the region); Uri Tours (known for its role in Dennis Rodman's and Eric Schmidt's trips to North Korea); Lupine Travel (a UK-based budget travel agency known for its DPRK Amateur Golf Open); Rocky Road Travel (a Berlin based company); Juche Travel Services (a UK-based company); and KTG (known for their small sized groups and affordable tours). FarRail Tours also takes tours to see operating steam railways and the Pyongyang Metro.

In 2016, an American college student, Otto Warmbier, was arrested and sentenced to 15 years' imprisonment for allegedly removing a propaganda poster from a wall in his Pyongyang hotel. At the time of his arrest, Warmbier was traveling with China-based tour operator Young Pioneer Tours (YPT) on a five-day tour of North Korea. He was later released and returned to the U.S. in a coma, which led to his death on 19 June 2017. As a result, YPT announced it would no longer take U.S. citizens to North Korea as the risk was "too high". Other North Korea tour companies announced they would also review their positions on accepting U.S. citizens. In July 2017, the U.S. government announced that U.S. citizens would no longer be permitted to visit North Korea as tourists. The travel ban took effect on September 1, 2017. The initial ban, which was set to expire on August 31, 2022, has been extended through August 31, 2023.

Tours from South Korea

In 2002, the area around Mount Kumgang, a scenic mountain close to the South Korea border, was designated as a special tourist destination: Mount Kumgang Tourist Region. Tours run by private companies brought thousands of South Koreans to Mount Kŭmgang every year before the suspension of tours in late 2008 due to the shooting of a South Korean tourist. When tours had not resumed by May 2010, North Korea unilaterally announced that it would seize South Korean real estate assets in the region.

In July 2005, the South Korean company Hyundai Group came to an agreement with the North Korean government to open up more areas to tourism, including Baekdu Mountain and Kaesong. Kaesong was opened to daily tours for South Korean and foreign tourists in December 2007; North Korea charged US $180 for a one-day trip. The city received several hundred tourists each week, mostly South Koreans.

The tours to Kaesong were suspended in December 2008 due to a political conflict between North and South Korean relating to propaganda balloons. The balloons, filled with information critical of Kim Jong-il and the North Korean regime, were sent into North Korea from just south of the border in South Korea. When South Korea did not respond to North Korean demands to stop the propaganda balloons, North Korea suspended the Kaesong tours. The tours to Kaesong resumed in April 2010, but were again suspended in May 2010 following the ROKS Cheonan sinking.

Tours from China
In April 2010, the first tourist trains from Dandong, China brought visitors to North Korea for a four-day tour. Before that, the international train from Beijing to Pyongyang was used as a tourist train.

In June 2011, Chinese citizens were allowed on a self-driven tour in North Korea for the first time.

As of January 2013, tourists are now able to bring their own mobile phones into North Korea, although without a North Korean SIM card (which became available to foreigners) the phone will not be able to make or receive calls. Previously, foreigners had to surrender their phones at the border (or airport) before entering the country.

The number of Chinese tourists visiting North Korea fell 70 percent from 2010 to 2011. One Chinese travel agency cited the limited number of packages and restrictions on where foreign tourists can travel as the main reasons for the lack of interest. Only the capital Pyongyang and Mount Kumgang are available on Chinese itineraries.

Various places are accessible from the Chinese side, such as Namyang and monasteries in Chilbosan from Tumen, China. In 2011, a Tumen-Korean train service was scheduled to start.

Though gambling is prohibited for North Korean citizens, two casinos exist in North Korea for the Chinese tourist market – the Imperial Hotel & Casino in Rason and the Pyongyang Casino in the Yanggakdo International Hotel in Pyongyang.

In 2016, the North Korean government allowed Chinese tourists to stay in North Korea for a maximum of six months.

Visa

In principle, any person is allowed to travel to North Korea; only South Koreans and journalists are routinely denied, although there have been some exceptions for journalists. For instance, Croatian journalists had special access in June 2012, although their phones were confiscated and returned as they departed and they had a special tour guide.

Travel agents can help potential visitors through the bureaucratic process. A tourist visa typically comes in the form of a blue travel paper stating "tourist card" and bearing the country's official name (Democratic People's Republic of Korea) in English and Korean, which is stamped by North Korean customs instead of the passport. The travel paper is taken away upon exiting the country. The tourist visa can also be issued, upon request, in the form of a sticker endorsed in the visitor's passport. However this is only possible if there are any diplomatic representations of North Korea in the visitor's home country. Visitors are not allowed to travel outside designated tour areas without their Korean guides.

Before 2010, tourists holding United States passports were not granted visas, except during the Arirang Festival mass games. U.S. citizens, journalists and citizens from other nations have also been given special permission to enter as members of the Korean Friendship Association and Choson Exchange. Citizens of South Korea require special permission from both governments to enter North Korea and are typically not granted such permission for regular tourism except in special tourist areas designated for South Koreans.

Only citizens of Singapore and Malaysia were allowed to enter North Korea on normal passports without a visa, although the exemptions for both citizens were revoked in February 2017.

See also

 List of hotels in North Korea
 List of tourist attractions in Pyongyang
 Masikryong Ski Resort
 Munsu Water Park
 Korea Central Zoo
 Propaganda in North Korea
 State General Bureau of Tourist Guidance

References

Further reading

External links

 Inside North Korea: the ultimate package tour - Carole Cadwalladr, The Observer, 14 February 2010
 Departures episode guide Departures season 3, episode 12-13
 Traveling North Korea - North Korean travel and photography blog
 DPR Korea Tour  - official website of the National Tourism Administration

 
North Korea

bn:উত্তর কোরিয়া#পর্যটন